Unexpected is a 2015 American drama film directed by Kris Swanberg, and co-written  by Swanberg and Megan Mercier. It  stars Cobie Smulders as a teacher at an inner city Chicago high school who unintentionally becomes pregnant. One of her students, Jasmine (Gail Bean), is also unexpectedly pregnant, and the two bond through planning their futures. The film had its world premiere at the 2015 Sundance Film Festival on January 25, 2015. The film was released in a limited release and released video on demand on July 24, 2015, by The Film Arcade.

Premise
An inner-city high school teacher develops an unlikely friendship with one of her most promising students while both struggle to navigate their unexpected pregnancies.

Cast
Cobie Smulders as Samantha Abbott
Gail Bean as Jasmine
Anders Holm as John
Elizabeth McGovern as Mrs. Abbott, Samantha's mother

Production
Swanberg took about two years to write the film's script. The film was shot in West Humboldt Park and East Garfield Park, Chicago, but takes place in Englewood. Cobie Smulders was pregnant during filming. The coinciding of Smulders' pregnancy with that of her character was not intentional. The film was completed in October 2014.

Release
The film had its world premiere at the 2015 Sundance Film Festival on January 25, 2015. Shortly after it was announced, The Film Arcade had acquired distribution rights to the film. The film was released on July 24, 2015, in a limited release, and through video on demand.

Reception
Unexpected was met with positive reviews. Film review aggregator website Rotten Tomatoes gives the film a 67% score, with an average rating of 6.4/10, based on reviews from 54 critics. The website's critical consensus reads, "Unexpected proves a thoughtful and well-acted — if somewhat mild — look at worthy, thought-provoking themes. On Metacritic, the film holds a weighted average rating of 65 out of 100, sampled from 20 film critics, indicating "generally favorable reviews".

Accolades

References

External links

2015 films
American drama films
American independent films
2015 drama films
American pregnancy films
Teenage pregnancy in film
The Film Arcade films
Films scored by Keegan DeWitt
2015 independent films
2010s English-language films
2010s American films